is a Japanese male curler.

At the national level, he is a 2018 Japan men's champion curler.

Teams

Personal life
He started curling in 2010 at the age of 11. He attended Sapporo International University.

References

External links

Video: 

Living people
1999 births
Japanese male curlers

Japanese curling champions
Competitors at the 2023 Winter World University Games